Springton may refer to:

 Springton, Prince Edward Island, Canada (specifically Queens County)
 Springton, South Australia
Springton Lake, Pennsylvania, a lake in the United States